Microzestis is a gelechioid moth genus usually placed in the cosmet moth family (Cosmopterigidae); its exact relationships are not yet resolved however. Only a single species is known, Microzestis inelegans. It occurs in the Marquesas Islands of Polynesia and is notable for the unusual habits of its caterpillars.

References
Natural History Museum Lepidoptera genus database

Cosmopterigidae
Monotypic moth genera
Moths of Oceania